Booneville is an unincorporated community in Lincoln County, Tennessee, in the United States.

History
A post office called Booneville was established in 1869, and remained in operation until it was discontinued in 1905. The community was named for pioneer Daniel Boone.

References

Unincorporated communities in Lincoln County, Tennessee
Unincorporated communities in Tennessee